ArtsBoston is a not-for-profit corporation assisting the performing arts industry in Boston, Massachusetts. Since its founding in 1975, ArtsBoston has been one of the nation's performing arts non-profits, second only to New York City's Theatre Development Fund.

ArtsBoston provides discount tickets to performing arts events at its BosTix booths and through its BosTix Advance program.

History 
In 2011, ArtsBoston received a $70,000 grant by the Massachusetts Cultural Council Adams Arts Program.

BosTix 
BosTix Booths are located in Faneuil Hall Marketplace and Copley Square, and sell half-price, day-of-show tickets. The booths also serve as a full-service Ticketmaster outlet, selling full-price tickets to events and local cultural attractions.

References

Non-profit organizations based in Boston
Non-profit corporations

External links 

 Official website